Two Tickets to London is a 1943 drama film made by Universal Pictures, and directed by Edwin L. Marin. The screenplay was written by Tom Reed, based on story by Roy William Neill. The film stars  Michèle Morgan and Alan Curtis.

Premise
A U.S. naval officer is found guilty for treason, but escapes with the help of a café entertainer.

Cast
Michèle Morgan as Jeanne 
Alan Curtis as First Mate Dan Driscoll 
C. Aubrey Smith as Admiralty Detective Fairchild 
Barry Fitzgerald as Captain McCardle 
Dooley Wilson as Accordionist 
Robert Warwick as Ormsby 
Matthew Boulton as Brighton 
Tarquin Olivier as Roddy, Jeanne's son 
Oscar O'Shea as Mr. Tinkle 
Mary Gordon as Mrs. Tinkle 
Holmes Herbert as Kilgallen 
Mary Forbes as Dame Dunne Hartley
Marie De Becker as Barmaid (uncredited)

Critical reception
Allmovie wrote "Too expensive for a B"-picture, yet not quite an A, Two Tickets to London is an acceptable vehicle for French leading lady Michele Morgan and Universal contract player Alan Curtis;" while TV Guide called it "A standard programmer," and rated it 2/5 stars.

References

External links

1943 films
American drama films
American black-and-white films
1940s English-language films
Films directed by Edwin L. Marin
Films set in England
Universal Pictures films
World War II films made in wartime
Films scored by Frank Skinner
1943 drama films